In enzymology, a nicotinate N-methyltransferase is an enzyme that catalyzes the chemical reaction

S-adenosyl-L-methionine + nicotinate  S-adenosyl-L-homocysteine + N-methylnicotinate

Thus, the two substrates of this enzyme are S-adenosyl methionine and nicotinate, whereas its two products are S-adenosylhomocysteine and N-methylnicotinate.

This enzyme belongs to the family of transferases, specifically those transferring one-carbon group methyltransferases.  The systematic name of this enzyme class is S-adenosyl-L-methionine:nicotinate N-methyltransferase. Other names in common use include furanocoumarin 8-methyltransferase, and furanocoumarin 8-O-methyltransferase.  This enzyme participates in nicotinate and nicotinamide metabolism.

Structural studies

As of late 2007, only one structure has been solved for this class of enzymes, with the PDB accession code .

References

 

EC 2.1.1
Enzymes of known structure